Your Baby Never Looked Good in Blue is a single by Exposé, released on March 21, 1990. Written by Diane Warren and produced by Lewis Martineé, the song was included on the group's second studio album, What You Don't Know. Lead vocals on the track were performed by Jeanette Jurado. The song was the fourth single released from What You Don't Know, and it is a romance-themed ballad sung from the perspective of a person whose lover is rumored to have "found someone new".

Background
Composer Diane Warren had submitted "Your Baby Never Looked Good in Blue" for consideration for Exposé to record along with the Warren composition "I'll Never Get Over You Getting Over Me": Arista president Clive Davis had indicated that only one of those two songs could be recorded by the group and while Jurado – who considered "both beautiful songs" – had favored the latter, the group's producer Lewis Martineé opted for "Your Baby Never Looked Good in Blue". (Exposé would be able to record "I'll Never Get Over You Getting Me" for their 1992 album Exposé with the track becoming a Top Ten hit.)

Reception
Los Angeles Times music critic Dennis Hunt, in a dismissive review of the What You Don't Know album, mentioned "Your Baby Never Looked Good in Blue" - (Dennis Hunt quote:) "which has mournful country-style lyrics" - as the album's "one top notch song". However in its single release, "Your Baby Never Looked Good in Blue" would end Exposé's streak of Top Ten singles - the group had scored seven - , peaking at #17 on the Billboard Hot 100 for the week ending May 26, 1990. The song was more successful on the Billboard adult contemporary chart, where it reached #9 in June of that year.

Music video
The music video shows scenes of the three vocalists performing at a concert, preparing for the performance backstage and surrounding a tour bus.

Track listing

U.S. 7" single (vinyl and cassette)
A - "Your Baby Never Looked Good in Blue" (3:54)
B - "Now That I Found You" (3:46)

Charts

References

External links
7" single info from discogs.com

1990 singles
Exposé (group) songs
Pop ballads
Songs written by Diane Warren
1989 songs
Arista Records singles